Kuldeep Singh (born 5 February 1966) is an Indian wrestler. He competed in the men's freestyle 52 kg at the 1988 Summer Olympics.

References

External links
 

1966 births
Living people
Indian male sport wrestlers
Olympic wrestlers of India
Wrestlers at the 1988 Summer Olympics
Place of birth missing (living people)
Wrestlers at the 1986 Asian Games
Asian Games competitors for India